Truckee High School is one of two high schools in the Tahoe-Truckee Unified School District, which is based in the Lake Tahoe area town of Truckee in eastern Nevada County, California.

Athletics 
Truckee High School is one of five California high schools who are a member of the Nevada Interscholastic Activities Association and competes in the 3A Northern League. In 2011 the girls volleyball team completed a "3-peat" state championship run.  In 2012 the football team completed a "4-peat" State Championship run and posted a 47-1 record over a 4 year span.  The baseball team is the 2-time defending state champion heading into the 2020 season. The Wolverines are best known for its football program. The Wolverines have won 13 Nevada state championships and have finished runner-up 7 times. The football team tied the Nevada state record (11-man) with 41 consecutive wins from 2009-2012. The football team was recently featured on KCRA news,.

Nevada Interscholastic Activities Association State championships
 Baseball - 1992(2A), 1994(2A), 2012(3A), 2018(3A), 2019(3A)
 Basketball (Boys) - 1983(2A), 1998(3A)
 Cross Country (Boys) - 2002
 Cross Country (Girls) - 2013, 2014
 Football - 1983(2A), 1990(2A), 1993(2A), 1996(3A), 1998(3A), 2001(3A), 2004(3A), 2005(3A), 2009(3A), 2010(3A), 2011(3A), 2012(D-1A), 2022(3A)
 Golf (Boys) - 2008, 2019 
 Golf (Girls) - 1998, 1999
 Skiing (Girls) - 2007, 2008, 2009
 Soccer (Boys) - 1995(2A), 1996, 1999, 2001, 2005, 2007, 2008, 2014 (D-1A)
 Soccer (Girls) - 1996, 1997, 1998, 2001, 2002, 2007, 2008, 2009, 2016, 2017, 2018, 2019
 Volleyball (Girls) - 2009, 2010, 2011, 2016

Band
Programs:
-Wind Ensemble
-Symphonic Band
-Jazz Bands (1 & 2)
-Jazz Combos (1 & 2)
Truckee High School's Band program was formerly directed by Mr. Dave Green, a well-known name in music, for almost two decades until he retired in 2013. During the 2013-2014 school year, the band was directed by Theresa Smith. Since her resignation in 2014, the band has been under the direction of Jesse Steele. The traditional bands (Wind Ensemble and Symphonic Band) contain around 70 students in total and are split into these two bands primary based on age (The Freshmen and Sophomores in Symphonic Band and the upperclassmen in Wind Ensemble). However, there are exceptions due to equalizing class sizes and scheduling conflicts with other classes. The students learn music theory, practice concert pieces, and play skills on their instruments during the school day. During the football season, the band members also participate in Marching Band and can be seen at the varsity home games. The students also have the option to participate in Region V Honor Band in Chico, California, Solo and Ensemble Festival, the local band festival, Sierra College Honor Band, and more. Annually, they take a trip known as band tour, during which they take a charter bus to San Francisco and the surrounding bay area, and Napa, California, and play at convalescent homes, children's hospitals, elementary schools which lack music programs, and Veterans homes.

Clubs and organizations
Truckee High School has an extensive list of programs for students participate in. These include:
 Academic Team
 California Scholarship Federation
 Chess Club
 Cooking Club
 Crossroads
 Boosters/ Project Grad
 House of Discussion
 Drama
 ELAC
 Envirolution Club
 Friday Night Live: Mentoring
 Friday Night Live: Natural High
 Gay Straight Alliance
 Interact
 La Raza
 Leadership
 Newspaper
 Peer Court
 Robotics
 School Site Council
 Sources of Strength
 Teen Advocates
 Teen Speakers' Bureau
 Wellness Center
 Yearbook

References

High schools in Placer County, California
Public high schools in California
1951 establishments in California

https://www.truckeepride.com/title-town/